Evelyn Sepp (born 13 July 1972 in Tallinn) is an Estonian sports figure and politician. She has been member of IX, X and XI Riigikogu.

She was a member of Estonian Centre Party until 2014.

References

1972 births
Living people
Estonian Centre Party politicians
Members of the Riigikogu, 1999–2003
Members of the Riigikogu, 2003–2007
Members of the Riigikogu, 2007–2011
Women members of the Riigikogu
University of Tartu alumni
Politicians from Tallinn
21st-century Estonian women politicians